Bodil Finsveen (23 September 1934 – 14 October 2008) was a Norwegian teacher, civil servant and politician.

She was born in Fåberg to farmers Johannes Finsveen and Ingerid Opjordsmoen. She was elected representative to the Storting for the period 1973–1977 for the Centre Party.

References

1934 births
2008 deaths
People from Oppland
Centre Party (Norway) politicians
Members of the Storting
Norwegian schoolteachers